Bryce Alderson (born February 5, 1994) is a Canadian former soccer player.

Club career
Alderson began his career with Toronto-based club Portugal FC in the Canadian Soccer League Reserve Division. In 2011, he joined Vancouver Whitecaps FC U-23. He impressed the under-23 side and appeared in two matches with Whitecaps FC in the 2011 MLS Reserve Division. On November 17, 2011 it was announced that Alderson would be joining the club's senior side for the 2012 season. He made his debut in a 2–1 win against the University of Victoria Vikes, coming on as a substitute in the Whitecaps third pre-season match of the season. Alderson was released from his contract with Vancouver on November 14, 2014.

In May 2015, Alderson joined Fortuna Düsseldorf II of the Regionalliga West.

Alderson announced his retirement from professional soccer in 2017 following several ankle injuries.

International career
Alderson captained the Canadian Under 17 team at the 2011 CONCACAF U-17 Championship as well as the 2011 FIFA U-17 World Cup. On December 12, 2011 Alderson was awarded the 2011 Canadian U-17 Player of the Year, this is the second consecutive year in which he has won the award receiving 39.6% of the vote.
Alderson was called up to the Canadian U-20 camp on December 2, 2011 for the first formal camp in preparation for qualification in 2013.
Alderson also joined the Canadian U-23 team for Olympic Qualifying in March 2012 starting his first match against El Salvador.

Honours

Individual
Canadian U-17 Player of the Year: 2010, 2011

References

External links
 

1994 births
Living people
Canada men's under-23 international soccer players
Canada men's youth international soccer players
Canadian soccer players
Canadian Soccer League (1998–present) players
Canadian expatriate soccer players
Charleston Battery players
Expatriate soccer players in the United States
USL League Two players
SC Toronto players
Soccer people from Ontario
Sportspeople from Kitchener, Ontario
USL Championship players
Vancouver Whitecaps FC players
Vancouver Whitecaps FC U-23 players
Association football midfielders
Homegrown Players (MLS)